Georges Michel (9 December 1946 – 8 March 2022) was a French rugby union player. After his playing career, he worked for Mutualité Sociale Agricole des Hautes-Pyrénées. He died on 8 March 2022, at the age of 75.

Awards
 Finalist in the 1964 
 Finalist in the 1968 
 Winner of the 1972–73 French Rugby Union Championship

References

External links
ESPN profile

1946 births
2022 deaths
French rugby union players
Rugby union fullbacks
Tarbes Pyrénées Rugby players
Sportspeople from Hautes-Pyrénées